Abdel-Kader Zaaf (27 January 1917 – 22 September 1986) was an Algerian cyclist. He participated four times in the Tour de France, for the first time in 1948, and then in 1950, 1951 and for the last time in 1952. He finished in last place in the 1951 Tour de France.

The Legend 
Although a professional rider for some time the legend of Abdel-Kader was cemented in the Tour the France of 1950. The exact circumstances of the 'incident' remain the stuff of cycling legend, but Abdel-Kader himself allegedly commented on it in 1982.

In 1950 Algeria was still part of France.

Stage 13 of the 1950 tour, from Perpignan to Nîmes, was a scorcher. Temperatures upwards of 40 °C were recorded. With still about 200 km to go in the stage, Abdel-Kader Zaaf attacked with  compatriot Marcel Molines.

They built up quite an impressive lead upwards of 30 minutes. But the heat was murderous, and team support not what it is today. Abdel-Kader accepted a bottle or bidon from a supporter alongside the road (some sources say a second bottle was also accepted) which allegedly contained wine or some other form of alcohol.

The alcohol combined with the heat had an immediate effect on Abdel-Kader, who started zigzagging and had to interrupt the stage. Considering the impressive lead, he decided to seek repose under a tree, and promptly fell asleep. He was awakened a short while later by some supporters claiming the peloton was fast approaching.

Abdel-Kader jumped on his bicycle and accelerated away. Unfortunately in the direction he had come from.

It is however fortunate that he did not collide with the peloton approaching fast. He was forced to dismount for a second time, and was taken to hospital.

Molines won the stage. But the legend of Abdel-Kader Zaaf was born.

Victories

References

External links

1917 births
1986 deaths
French male cyclists
People from Blida Province
Algerian male cyclists